Lodewijk Fluttert (born 8 October 1991), best known by his stage name Bakermat, is a Dutch DJ and music producer. His music is characterized by a mix of electronic, deep and tropical house, techno music produced in a minimalist manner with jazz and soul influences.

Career

2012–2013: Vandaag
Fluttert started his musical career while studying psychology at Utrecht University and moonlighting as a DJ in his spare time. He released his first two EPs in 2012 titled "Zomer" and "Vandaag". The title track from the latter, consisting of an integrated sample of the "I Have a Dream" speech by Martin Luther King Jr., charted as a single in the Netherlands, Belgium and France in late 2012 and spring of 2013. In 2014, it was re-released by Sony becoming a major charting hit particularly in Germany and Austria. In December 2014, Bakermat received a platinum record for his single "Vandaag" in Germany. His 'Uitzicht' EP was released in 2013 on Soundplate Records. Other popular tunes included "Black Cat John Brown, Leven, Strandfeest" and "Intro".

In this early stage of his career, Bakermat's different approach to dance music inspired many other artists to develop their career in this style (often referred to as 'melodic house' or 'tropical house'). Artists like Klingande, Kungs, Lost Frequencies, Felix Jaehn, Sam Feldt, Thomas Jack, Kygo and many more started making music in this genre.

Bakermat often distinguishes himself in his performances compared to other DJ’s by including live elements to his DJ sets. He combines his music with live artists on stage (saxophonists, singers, violinists and percussionists). In 2014, he gathered 6 musicians and formed the ‘Bakermat Live Band’, which was the foundation of his live band tour.

2014–2015: Bakermat Live Band

In 2014 Bakermat confirmed that he would perform at the 2014 edition of Tomorrowland. That gave birth to the first stage host of Bakermat & Friends at Tomorrowland, and laid the foundation for further editions growing in to 2015 and 2016.

In collaboration with Live Nation, Bakermat began his first tour with the Bakermat Live Band. Starting in Paris, he sold out the Olympia concert hall in 3 weeks. Following Olympia, Bakermat went on to sell out his Europe Tour, which included a night at London's Brixton Academy.

After the summer he made an official remix for Labrinth's single "Jealous" and later that year released the single, "Teach Me", on the Dirty Soul Music division of Be Yourself Music. "Teach Me" was influenced by gospel, soul, blues and jazz in combination with samples of the American gospel singer, Shirley Caesar. When "Teach Me" was released, Bakermat was also charting with his remix of the house legend MK.

In December 2014 Bakermat announced the Another Man Tour, his first tour in North America. He played 28 shows in 30 days, from New York City to Miami and from Ultra Music Festival to Lightning in a Bottle.

2015–2016: Bakermat's Circus
Starting in 2015, Bakermat created a new platform for artists, the audience and himself called Bakermat's Circus. His idea behind it was "to create a night where artists could push themselves musically and the audience would be carried away music, event and ambience wise". He started the trail for the shows at his residency venue in Paris, the Zig Zag Club. Soon after he travelled to London, performing two sold-out shows in a row at Electric Brixton. Since then Bakermat's Circus has travelled to London, New York City, Amsterdam, Ibiza, Paris, Rio de Janeiro, São Paulo, Malta and hosted stages at festivals like Tomorrowland and Airbeat One. Bakermat also organises his own ‘Circus’ festivals in Amsterdam. Notable guests at the shows have included Oliver Heldens, Robin Schulz, Don Diablo, Klingande, Kungs, Sam Feldt, Tube & Berger and many more.

Soon after this his monthly radio show Bakermat's Circus debuted. The series was aired on over 75 radio stations worldwide from SiriusXM to Radio538 and Revolution FM.

Former head of ID&T Duncan Stutterheim said of Bakermat on Radio538's Dance Department: "Bakermat was one of the few artists that brought something spectacular and refreshing to the stage, and he was also one of the few that didn't just press play during a performance." This led to the invitation for Bakermat to play at Stutterheim's Sensation event.

After the summer, Bakermat returned to his hometown in Amsterdam to prepare for his annual show at Amsterdam Dance Event. Together with Goldfish he sold out a 5,500 capacity venue inviting artists like Don Diablo, Lost Frequencies, Alle Farben, Michael Calfan and Sam Feldt to perform.

2016: Living
In 2016 Bakermat released new music and also toured. Having released his Games EP early in the year, "Games Continued", one of the tracks featured on the EP, officially became Corona's Sunsets anthem for 2016. To celebrate this, Bakermat performed at a rooftop event in London where his set was streamed live via Mixmag alongside support acts including Busy P, Sinead Harnett and Mr. M.

In addition to Games, Bakermat released another EP titled Ballade, which incorporated influences from classical and pop music. Later in the year, Bakermat released the Living EP, the title track of which features British singer-songwriter, Alex Clare.

Discography

Studio albums

Singles

References

Notes 
 A  "One Day (Vandaag)" was also known as "Vandaag" , it was released in August 2012.

Sources

External links 

Official Website
Last.fm

Dutch DJs
Dutch record producers
Living people
Utrecht University alumni
People from Hof van Twente
1991 births
Tropical house musicians
Electronic dance music DJs